Laura Cavendish, Countess of Burlington (née Roundell, formerly Montagu; born 1972) is a British fashion consultant. She is the daughter of Richard Roundell, deputy chairman of Christie's, and his wife, Anthea, both of Dorfold Hall, a Jacobean house in Cheshire. 

A contributing editor for Vogue, she has been on the New Generation board of the British Fashion Council since 2010 and has consulted for a number of brands including Selfridges and Acne. In 2017 she led the "House Style" exhibition at Chatsworth curated by Hamish Bowles and designed by Patrick Kinmonth and co-wrote a book by the same name.

Marriages and children
She married firstly, in August 1996 at Acton Parish Church, Hon. Orlando William Montagu (born 16 January 1971), the younger son of the 11th Earl of Sandwich. They had no children before divorcing in 2002.

She announced her engagement to the aristocratic photographer William Cavendish, Earl of Burlington (born 6 June 1969), heir to the Duke of Devonshire, on 23 December 2006 in The Times.  The couple married in March 2007, and a wedding reception was held in early August 2007 at Lismore Castle, County Waterford, Ireland, which is now their home.

Cavendish is now known as the Countess of Burlington, or more informally as Laura Burlington.

The couple has three children, a son and two daughters:
 Lady Maud Cavendish (born 2009)
 James Cavendish, Lord Cavendish (born 2010), second in line of succession to the Dukedom of Devonshire
 Lady Elinor Cavendish (born 2013)

Their main home is at Bolton Abbey which Lady Burlington has refurbished.

References

External links
Laura Roundell photographed in the Duke of Westminster's family heirlooms. Last accessed 13 September 2007.

1972 births
Living people
English socialites
English female models
British courtesy countesses
British courtesy marchionesses